Lawn is a town in Taylor County, Texas, in the United States. As of the 2010 census, the town population was 314. It is part of the Abilene, Texas Metropolitan Statistical Area.

Geography

Lawn is located at  (32.135405, –99.748066).

According to the United States Census Bureau, the town has a total area of 0.6 square miles (1.5 km2), all of it land.

Demographics

2020 census

As of the 2020 United States census, there were 311 people, 145 households, and 92 families residing in the town.

2000 census
As of the census of 2000, there were 353 people, 137 households, and 100 families residing in the town. The population density was 625.5 people per square mile (243.4/km2). There were 162 housing units at an average density of 287.1 per square mile (111.7/km2). The racial makeup of the town was 96.88% White, 0.28% Native American, 0.28% Asian, 0.57% Pacific Islander, 1.13% from other races, and 0.85% from two or more races. Hispanic or Latino of any race were 8.22% of the population.

There were 137 households, out of which 38.7% had children under the age of 18 living with them, 57.7% were married couples living together, 10.9% had a female householder with no husband present, and 27.0% were non-families. 24.8% of all households were made up of individuals, and 14.6% had someone living alone who was 65 years of age or older. The average household size was 2.58 and the average family size was 3.04.

In the town, the population was spread out, with 27.2% under the age of 18, 6.2% from 18 to 24, 27.2% from 25 to 44, 24.6% from 45 to 64, and 14.7% who were 65 years of age or older. The median age was 39 years. For every 100 females, there were 101.7 males. For every 100 females age 18 and over, there were 91.8 males.

The median income for a household in the town was $28,281, and the median income for a family was $29,625. Males had a median income of $25,000 versus $17,500 for females. The per capita income for the town was $13,347. About 15.2% of families and 19.8% of the population were below the poverty line, including 29.0% of those under age 18 and 7.3% of those age 65 or over.

Education
The town of Lawn is served by the Jim Ned Consolidated Independent School District.

Climate
The climate in this area is characterized by hot, humid summers and generally mild to cool winters.  According to the Köppen climate classification, Lawn has a humid subtropical climate, Cfa on climate maps.

Notable people 

 Sunshine Parker, (1927–1999) actor known for roles including Emmitt in Road House 1989, as well many Character roles in movie and Television. Real name, Lloyd Olen Parker

References

External links
Google Street View

Towns in Taylor County, Texas
Towns in Texas
Abilene metropolitan area